China Kong (born 1960) is an American actor, writer, and producer. She is the widow of director Donald Cammell, having met him when she was 14 years of age and he was 40 years of age in 1974. After having an affair, the two would wed 4 years later in 1978.

Her most noted acting role was in Cammell's 1987 film White of the Eye, which she also co-wrote.

China Kong's sister, Stephani Kong, acted as Brando's photographer on The Missouri Breaks and Superman.

References
Brando, Marlon, and Donald Cammell. (2005) Fan-Tan, pp. 238–39.

External links

 Donald Cammell @ pHinnWeb

1960 births
Living people
20th-century American actresses
American writers of Chinese descent
American film actresses
American actresses of Chinese descent
21st-century American women